In computer science, a channel system is a finite state machine similar to communicating finite-state machine in which there is a single system communicating with itself instead of many systems communicating with each other.  A channel system is similar to a pushdown automaton where a queue  is used  instead of a stack. Those queues are called channels. Intuitively, each channel represents a sequence a message to be sent, and to be read in the order in which they are sent.

Definition

Channel system 
Formally, a channel system (or perfect channel system)  is defined as a tuple  with:
  a finite set of control states,
  an initial state,
  a finite alphabet (for the sake of notation simplicity, let ),
  a finite set of channels,
  a finite alphabet of messages,
  a finite set of transition rules with  being the set of finite (potentially empty) words over the alphabet .

Depending on the author, a channel system may have no initial state and may have an empty alphabet.

Configuration 
Intuitively, a configuration  represents that a run is in state  and that its -th channel contains the word .

Step 

Formally, given a configuration , and a transition , there is a perfect step , where the step adds a letter  to the end of the -th word.

Run 
A perfect run is a sequence of perfect step, of the form .

Languages 
Given a perfect or a lossy channel system , multiple languages may be defined.

I.e. as the set of configurations  such that .

Channel system and Turing machine 
Most problem related to perfect channel system are undecidable. This is due to the fact that such a machine may simulates the run of a Turing machine. This simulation is now sketched.

Intuitively, this simulation consists simply in having the entire tape of the simulated Turing machine in a channel. The content channel is then entirely read and immediately rewritten in the channel, with one exception, the part of the content representing the head of the Turing machine is changed, to simulate a step of the Turing machine computation.

Variants 
Multiple variants of channel systems have been introduced. The two variants introduced below does not allow to simulate a Turing machine and thus allows multiple problem of interest to be decidable.

One channel machine 
A one-channel machine is a channel system using a single channel. The same definition also applies for all variants of channel system.

Counter machine 
When the alphabet of a channel system contains a single message, then each channel is essentially a counter. It follows that those systems are essentially Minsky machines. We call such systems counter machines. This same definition applies for all variants of channel system.

Completely specified protocol 
A completely specified protocol (CSP) is defined exactly as a channel system. However, the notion of step and of run are defined differently.

A CSP admits two kinds of steps. Perfect steps, as defined above, and a message loss transition step.

Looseness 
A lossy channel system or machine capable of lossiness error is an extension of completely specified protocol in which letters may disappear anywhere.

A lossy channel system admits two kinds of steps. Perfect steps, as defined above, and lossy step. We denote a lossy step, .

A run in which channel are emptied as soon as messages are sent into them is a valid run according to this definition. For this reason, some fairness conditions may be introduced to those systems.

Channel fairness 

A computation is said to be channel fair if it is channel fair with respect to each channel .

Impartiality 
The impartiality condition is a restriction to the channel fairness condition in which both the channel and the letter are considered.

It is said to be impartial if it is impartial with respect to every channels .

Message fairness 
The message fairness property is similar to impartiality, but the condition only have to hold if there is an infinite number of step at which  may be read.

Boundedness 
The run is said to have bounded lossiness if the number of letter removed between two perfect steps is bounded.

Insertion of errors 
A machine capable of insertion of error is an extension of channel system in which letters may appear anywhere.

A machine capable of insertion of error admits two kinds of steps. Perfect steps, as defined above, and insertion steps.

Duplication errors 
A machine capable of duplication error is an extension of machine capable of insertion of error in which the inserted letter is a copy of the previous letter.

A machine capable of insertion of error admits two kinds of steps. Perfect steps, as defined above, and duplication steps.

A non-duplicate machine capable of duplication error is a machine which ensures that in each channel, the letters alternate between a special new letter #, and a regular letter from the alphabet of message. If it is not the caes, it means a duplication occurred and the run rejects. This process allow to encode any channel system into a machine capable of duplication error, while forcing it not to have errors. Since channel systems can simulate machines, it follows that machines capable of duplication error can simulate Turing machine.

Properties 
The set of reachable configurations is recognizable for lossy channel machines and machines capable of insertions of errors. It is recursively enumerable for machine capable of duplication error.

Problems and their complexity 
This section contain a list of problems over channel system, and their decidability of complexity over variants of such systems.

Termination problem 
This problem is undecidable over perfect channel systems, even when the system is a counter machine or when it is a one-channel machine.

This problem is decidable but nonprimitive recursive over lossy channel system.  This problem is trivially decidable over machine capable of insertion of errors.

Reachability problem 

This problem is undecidable over perfect channel systems and decidable but nonprimitive recursive over lossy channel system. This problem is decidable over machine capable of insertion of errors .

Reachability problem 
The deadlock problem consists in deciding whether there is a reachable configuration without successor. This problem is decidable over lossy channel system and trivially decidable over machine capable of insertion of errors. It is also decidable over counter machine.

Model checking problem 
The model checking problem consists in deciding whether given a system  and a CTL**-formula or a LTL-formula  or a  whether the language defined by  satisfies . This problem is undecidable over lossy channel system.

Recurrent state problem 
This problem is undecidable over lossy channel system, even with a single channel.

Equivalent finite state machine 
Given a system , there is no algorithm which computes a finite state machine representing   for the class of lossy channel system. This problem is decidable over machine capable of insertion of error .

Boundedness problem 
The boundedness problem consists in deciding whether the set of reachable configuration is finite. I.e. the length of the content of each channel is bounded.  This problem is trivially decidable over machine capable of insertion of errors. It is also decidable over counter machine.

Eventually properties 
This problem is undecidable for lossy channel system with impartiality and with the two other fairness constraints.

Safety property 
The safety property problem consists in deciding, given a channel system  and a regular set  whether

Structural termination 
This problem is undecidable even over counter machine.

Communicating Hierarchical State Machine

Hierarchical state machines are finite state machines whose states themselves can be other machines. Since a communicating finite state machine is characterized by concurrency, the most notable trait in a communicating hierarchical state machine is the coexistence of hierarchy and concurrency. This had been considered highly suitable as it signifies stronger interaction inside the machine.

However, it was proved that the coexistence of hierarchy and concurrency intrinsically costs language inclusion, language equivalence, and all of universality.

References 

Concurrency (computer science)
Models of computation